Higher education in Italy is mainly provided by a large and international network of public and state affiliated universities. State-run universities of Italy are under the supervision of Italian's Ministry of Education. There is also a number of private universities and state-run post-secondary educational centers providing a vocational instruction.

Italian universities are among the oldest universities in the world. In particular the University of Bologna (founded in 1088, the oldest university in the world), the University of Padua, founded in 1222, and the University of Naples, founded in 1224, are among the most ancient state universities in Europe. Most universities in Italy are state-supported.

33 Italian universities were ranked among the world's top 500 in 2019, the third-largest number in Europe after the United Kingdom and Germany. The Bocconi University, Università Cattolica del Sacro Cuore, LUISS, Polytechnic University of Turin, Polytechnic University of Milan, Sapienza University of Rome, and University of Milan are also ranked among the best in the world.

Structure

Universities

Universities in Italy fits the framework of the Bologna Process since the adoption, in 1999, of the so-called 3+2 system. The first level degree is the Laurea triennale that can be achieved after three years of studies. Selected students can then complete their studies in the following step: two additional years of specialization which leads to the Laurea Magistrale.

The "Laurea triennale" corresponds roughly to a Bachelor Degree while the "Laurea Magistrale" corresponds to a Master Degree. Only the Laurea Magistrale grants access to third cycle programmes (Post-MA degrees, Doctorates or Specializing schools), that last 2 to 5 years (usually completing a PhD takes 3 years). However, there is just a single five-year degree "Laurea Magistrale Quinquennale" (Five-Year Master of Arts) for some programmes such as Law (Facoltà di Giurisprudenza), Arts (Accademia di Belle Arti) and Music (Conservatorio di Musica). Medical schools (Facoltà di Medicina e Chirurgia) are part of some universities and they only offer six-year courses. The title for MA/MFA/MD/MEd graduate students is Dottore (abbreviation in Dott./Dott.ssa or Dr., meaning Doctor). This title is not to be confused with the PhD and Post-MA graduates, whose title is Dottore di Ricerca (Research Doctor or Philosophy Doctor).

The Italian master's degree should not be confused with Italian "Masters" that are one-year specialistic postgraduate courses which guarantee a more practical education but do not necessarily give access to doctoral studies.

Universities in Italy can be divided into 4 groups:
 state-funded public universities: this category comprises most Italian universities, particularly the largest institutions.
 universities funded by other public authority (other than the state, such as Provinces): this is the case of the Free University of Bozen-Bolzano.
 private universities officially recognized by the Ministry of Education.
 superior graduate schools, which focus only on postgraduate education.

Superior Graduate Schools

The Superior Graduate School (Grandes écoles) or Scuola Superiore Universitaria offer recognized national and international titles, including the Diploma di Perfezionamento equivalent to a Doctorate, Dottorato di Ricerca i.e. Research Doctorate or Doctor Philosophiae i.e. Ph.D. and are recognized by the Ministry of Education, Universities and Research (Italy) (MIUR) as fully autonomous. Some of them also organize courses Master's degree, individually, or jointly with the universities with whom they work like Bologna Business School or MIP Politecnico di Milano.

There are three Superior Graduate Schools with "university status", three institutes with the status of Doctoral Colleges, which function at graduate and post-graduate level. Nine further schools are direct offshoots of the universities (i.e. do not have their own 'university status').

The first one is the Scuola Normale Superiore di Pisa (founded in 1810 by Napoleon as a branch of École Normale Supérieure), taking the model of organization from the famous École Normale Supérieure.

Sant'Anna School of Advanced Studies also has long history of existence within overall Italian educational excellence, as its origins are in Collegio Medico-Giuridico of Scuola Normale Superiore di Pisa and Conservatorio di Sant’Anna, an even older educational institution originating its roots in the 14th century.

These institutions are commonly referred to as "Schools of Excellence" (i.e. "Scuole di Eccellenza").

Professional higher education
Higher education in Italy is mainly covered by universities (Sistema di accreditamento degli studi universitari MIUR e verifica standard qualitativi ANVUR) and superior graduate schools, with almost no professional or vocational school following the secondary education. This is considered a weak point of the Italian post-secondary education. However, Italian system provides a few vocational schools and courses. There are two main vocational paths after having obtained a secondary degree: those courses called "Istruzione e Formazione Tecnica Superiore" (IFTS; "Higher technical training and education"), and the "Istituti Tecnici Superiori" (ITS; "Higher technical institutes").

The first ones, IFTS, were established in the late nineties and are managed on regional basis. An IFTS course lasts between 1 and 2 years and it is usually strictly connected with a secondary school specialised in the same field of studies. These courses were generally unsuccessfully: in 2007 on a number of 450.000 students with a secondary degree, only 2430 of them (0,54%) followed an IFTS course. The ITS, created in 2008, lasts 2 years and are managed by a secondary institute in collaboration with local universities or institutions.

In 2013, only 59 professional higher courses were available.

See also
Academic ranks in Italy
Education in Italy
List of universities in Italy
Centro Universitario Sportivo Italiano
 Open access in Italy

References

Further reading
 Ballarino, Gabriele, and Nazareno Panichella. "Social stratification, secondary school tracking and university enrolment in Italy." Contemporary Social Science 11.2-3 (2016): 169–182.
 Checchi, Daniele. "University education in Italy." International Journal of Manpower (2000) online.
 Fabbris, Luigi. Effectiveness of University Education in Italy (Physica-Verlag Heidelberg, 2007).
 Lehmann, Erik E., et al. "Approaching effects of the economic crisis on university efficiency: a comparative study of Germany and Italy." Eurasian Business Review 8.1 (2018): 37–54. online
 Luzzatto, Giunio. "Higher Education in Italy 1985-95: an overview." 'European Journal of Education 31.3 (1996): 371-378. online
 Meoli, Michele, Eleonora Pierucci, and Silvio Vismara. "The effects of public policies in fostering university spinoffs in Italy." Economics of Innovation and New Technology 27.5-6 (2018): 479-492. online
 Mortari, Luigina, and Roberta Silva. "Teacher Education in Italy." in Teacher Education in the Global Era (Springer, Singapore, 2020) pp. 115-132.
 Todeschini, Marco Enrico. "Teacher Education in Italy: New Trends." Studies on Higher Education (2003): 223+. online
 Türk, Umut. "Socio-economic determinants of student mobility and inequality of access to higher education in Italy." Networks and Spatial Economics 19.1 (2019): 125-148 online.

Historical

 Denley, Peter. "‘Medieval’,‘Renaissance’,‘modern’. Issues of periodization in Italian university history." Renaissance Studies 27.4 (2013): 487-503. 
 Deplano, Valeria. "Making Italians: colonial history and the graduate education system from the liberal era to Fascism." Journal of Modern Italian Studies 18.5 (2013): 580-598.
 Lazzini, Arianna, Giuseppina Iacoviello, and Rosella Ferraris Franceschi. "Evolution of accounting education in Italy, 1890–1935." Accounting History 23.1-2 (2018): 44-70 online.
 Minio-Paluello, L. Education In Fascist Italy (1946) online
 Montgomery, Walter A. Education in Italy (1919) online
 Papi, Luca, et al. "Accounting for power and resistance: The University of Ferrara under the Fascist regime in Italy." Critical Perspectives on Accounting'' 62 (2019): 59–76.
 Pomante, Luigiaurelio. "The Researches on the History of University and Higher Education in Italy: A Critical Appraisal of the Last Twenty Years." The Researches on the History of university and Higher Education in Italy (2010): 1000–1031.

 
 
Italy